Marshall Darrow Shulman (1916 - June 21, 2007) was an American diplomat, scholar of Soviet studies and the founding director of W. Averell Harriman Institute for Advanced Study of the Soviet Union at Columbia University.

Born in Jersey City, New Jersey, Shulman earned a bachelor's degree from the University of Michigan, a graduate degree in English literature from Harvard University, and a master's degree from Columbia University's Russian Institute.

He served as an information officer for the US mission to the United Nations, as special assistant to Dean Acheson, and as special adviser on Soviet affairs to Secretary of State Cyrus R. Vance. He was also an associate director of the Russian Research Center at Harvard University.

External links
Marshall Shulman's obituary, Washington Post
Marshall Shulman's obituary, Los Angeles Times
Books by Marshall Shulman
Founding director of Columbia University's Soviet institute dies at 91

1916 births
United States Department of State officials
Historians of Russia
Harvard University alumni
Columbia University alumni
University of Michigan alumni
Columbia University faculty
2007 deaths